United Nations Security Council Resolution 2027 was unanimously adopted on 20 December 2011, after recalling resolutions 1719 (2006), 1791 (2007), 1858 (2008) and 1902 (2009) and 1959 (2010). It mandated that the UNSC will "continue its support for the Government of Burundi in the areas of socio-economic development, reintegrating conflict-affected populations and deepening the country’s regional integration."

See also 
List of United Nations Security Council Resolutions 2001 to 2100

References

External links 
Full text of UNSCR 2027

 2027
2027
2011 in Burundi
December 2011 events